Personal Life is the fifth album from the Portland-based indie rock band The Thermals. The album was released on September 7, 2010, on Kill Rock Stars.  It is the first to feature drummer Westin Glass, who joined after the completion of 2009's Now We Can See and remained with the band until their 2018 dissolution.

As the album was recorded and mixed on analog tape, and mastered for vinyl without digital processes, the vinyl edition boasts a SPARS code of AAA.

The first single from the album to be released was "I Don't Believe You". The music video features Sleater-Kinney member Carrie Brownstein and Modest Mouse frontman Isaac Brock.  "Never Listen to Me" and "Not Like Any Other Feeling" were the other singles.

Reception

Reviews of Personal Life represent a diverse mix of opinions on the album. The album holds a score of 72 out of 100 from Metacritic based on "generally favorable reviews".

The album debuted at  No. 180 on the Billboard 200 albums chart on its first week in the United States. It also debuted at No. 30 on the Independent Albums, and No. 16 on the Tastemaker Albums charts.

Track listing

Personnel
 Kathy Foster - bass, vocals, noise
 Hutch Harris - guitar, vocals
 Westin Glass - drums, vocals

Charts

References

The Thermals albums
2010 albums
Kill Rock Stars albums